Providenciales International Airport , on the island of Providenciales in the Caicos Islands, is the main international airport serving the Turks and Caicos Islands, a British Overseas Territory of the United Kingdom. It is operated by Turks and Caicos Islands Airports Authority (TCIAA). The territory's other international airport is JAGS McCartney International Airport on Grand Turk Island. Currently, there are more than 12,000 commercial aircraft operations per year.

Facilities 
This project has now been completed and the renovation was finished by December 2014.

Airlines and destinations

Passenger

Locally-based  air carriers interCaribbean Airways and Caicos Express Airways both currently operate respective hubs at the Providenciales International Airport.

Cargo

Historical passenger airline service

 Air Florida was operating nonstop Boeing 737 jet service to Miami (MIA) in 1984.  
 By 1985, Providenciales was being served by Cayman Airways with nonstop service to Miami being operated once a week with Boeing 727-200 jetliners as well as by Atlantic Gulf Airlines which was flying British Aircraft Corporation BAC One-Eleven service nonstop to Miami and also direct to MIA via a stop in Grand Turk.  
 Pan American World Airways (Pan Am) was also serving the airport in 1985 with Boeing 727-200 jet service nonstop to Miami twice a week. The next year in 1986 British Caribbean Airways was operating nonstop service to Miami flown with a British Aerospace BAe 146-100 jet as part of its Tortola, British Virgin Islands - Providenciales - Miami route.  In 1987, Pan Am was flying a "triangle" routing of Miami - Grand Turk - Providenciales - Miami four days a week with a Boeing 727, and in 1989 Pan Am was operating three nonstop flights a week to Miami with Boeing 727-200 jets. By 1991, Pan Am had increased its service to four Boeing 727-200 flights a week nonstop to Miami while at the same time Cayman Airways was operating two nonstop flights a week to Miami with Boeing 737-200 jets. 
 In 1993-1994 Carnival Air Lines was operating two nonstop flights a week to Miami with Boeing 727-100 jetliners.  
 American Airlines was serving the airport by 1994 with a single daily nonstop Boeing 757-200 flight from Miami while at the same time Turks and Caicos Airways Ltd., which was based in nearby Grand Turk, was operating Boeing 737-200 service from Miami five days a week either nonstop or via a stop in Grand Turk.  Three airlines were operating nonstop flights to Miami in early 1995:  American was continuing to serve Providenciales with a daily Boeing 727-200 nonstop flight plus a Saturday only Boeing 727-200 nonstop, Turks and Caicos Airways was flying nonstop with a Boeing 737-200 four days a week and Gray Line Air was operating nonstop Convair 580 turboprop service nine times a week.  In 1999, American was operating daily nonstop Boeing 727-200 service to Miami while at the same time Bahamasair was operating nonstop Boeing 737-200 flights to both Miami and Nassau twice a week.  By 2001, American was operating three daily nonstop flights to Miami with Boeing 737-800 aircraft and was also flying a Saturday only nonstop to New York John F. Kennedy Airport with a Boeing 737-800.

Currently, the largest aircraft type serving the airport on a scheduled basis is the wide-body Boeing 777-200 operated by British Airways with direct flights once a week to London Gatwick Airport via an intermediate stop in Antigua.

References

External links

 Providenciales International Airport, official site
 Providenciales International Airport, unofficial site
 PLS International Airport, unofficial site
 Turks and Caicos Islands Government: Civil Aviation
 Vancouver Airport Services (provides management and operations services at airport)
 
 

Airports in the Turks and Caicos Islands
Buildings and structures in Providenciales